Nerkin Nedzhirlu (also, Nedzhirlu and Nizhneye Nedzhirlu) is a town in the Ararat Province of Armenia.

See also
 Ararat Province

References 

Populated places in Ararat Province